That's Entertainment! III is a 1994 American documentary film released by Metro-Goldwyn-Mayer to celebrate the studio's 70th anniversary. It was the third in a series of retrospectives that began with the first That's Entertainment! (1974) and That's Entertainment, Part II (1976). Although posters and home video packaging use the title without an exclamation mark, the actual on-screen title of the film uses it.

In order to provide a "hook" for audiences who by 1994 had become accustomed to viewing classic movies on home video and cable TV (luxuries not widely available when the first two That's Entertainment! films were released), not to mention the fact so many sequences had already been featured in the first two films, the producers decided to showcase footage cut from famous MGM musicals. Many of these numbers were shown for the first time in That's Entertainment! III.

Highlights include:

 An alternate version of Eleanor Powell's extended tap dance routine to "Fascinating Rhythm" from Lady Be Good, shot from a second camera that revealed the well-orchestrated, behind the cameras activity needed to keep the scene moving smoothly.
 "Ain't it the Truth", a Lena Horne performance from Cabin in the Sky which was cut (Horne suggests it was censored) before the film's release because Horne was a black woman singing the song in a bubble bath.
 Several previously unseen Judy Garland production numbers, including "Mr. Monotony", cut from Easter Parade because it was deemed too risque for the period of the film (the half-tuxedo outfit Garland wears in this number is the same as the one she'd wear in the "Get Happy" number from Summer Stock three years later); an extravagant musical number, "March of the Doagies", cut from The Harvey Girls; and two numbers filmed for Annie Get Your Gun ("I'm an Indian Too" and "Doin' What Comes Natur'lly") before Garland was fired from the production and replaced by Betty Hutton. Garland then made Summer Stock, her last film for MGM in 1950. The original theatrical release omits "Doin' What Comes Naturally" but is included on the home video version.
 Footage from a junked 1930 musical called The March of Time, in particular a sequence called "The Lock Step" featuring The Dodge Twins which strongly resembles the later title musical sequence from the 1957 Elvis Presley film Jailhouse Rock (also featured in That's Entertainment! III). 
 Debbie Reynolds singing "You Are My Lucky Star" in a sequence cut from Singin' in the Rain.
 Ava Gardner's unused vocal performance of "Can't Help Lovin' Dat Man" for Show Boat before she was dubbed by vocalist Annette Warren.
 The opening dance sequence from The Barkleys of Broadway with the credits overlay removed so that the dance routine by Fred Astaire and Ginger Rogers can be viewed unobstructed for the first time.
 An alternate performance of "I Wanna Be a Dancin' Man" by Astaire from the film The Belle of New York. In the alternate take, Astaire wears informal clothes; the studio requested the number be reshot in formal dress. In the film, both performances are shown side-by-side to demonstrate the thoroughness of Astaire's rehearsal process since, his costumes aside, both performances are virtually identical.
 An unused performance of the song "Two-Faced Woman" lip-synched by Cyd Charisse from The Band Wagon, presented side-by-side with a performance from the film Torch Song using the same vocal track but now lip-synched by Joan Crawford in blackface.
 An alternate version of "A Lady Loves" performed by Debbie Reynolds in I Love Melvin, intercut with the version used in the film (the cut version is set in a farmyard while the version used takes place in opulent surroundings).
 A contortionist performance from the film Broadway Rhythm, featuring the Ross Sisters.

Hosts for the third installment in the That's Entertainment! series were Gene Kelly (in his last  film appearance), June Allyson, Cyd Charisse, Lena Horne, Howard Keel, Ann Miller, Debbie Reynolds, Mickey Rooney, and Esther Williams, making her first appearance in a theatrical film in more than 30 years. That's Entertainment! III had a limited theatrical release in 1994. According to film historian Robert Osborne, writing for The Hollywood Reporter at the time, the film did "pleasant business" at New York's Ziegfeld Theatre.

All three films were released to DVD in 2004. The box set collection of the films included a bonus DVD that included additional musical numbers that had been cut from MGM films as well as the first release of the complete performance of "Mr. Monotony" by Judy Garland (the version used in That's Entertainment! III is truncated). The home video version of That's Entertainment! III also contains several musical numbers not seen in the theatrical release. The film was later remastered for high-definition release on Blu-ray and HD DVD.

Appearances 

 June Allyson
 Fred Astaire
 Lucille Ball
 Jack Benny
 Ingrid Bergman
 Ray Bolger
 Lucille Bremer
 Jack Buchanan
 Billie Burke
 Cyd Charisse
 Claudette Colbert
 Joan Crawford
 Xavier Cugat
 Arlene Dahl
 Marion Davies
 Doris Day
 Gloria DeHaven
 Marlene Dietrich
 Marie Dressler
 Jimmy Durante
 Buddy Ebsen
 Nelson Eddy
 Cliff Edwards
 Vera-Ellen
 Nanette Fabray
 Greta Garbo
 Ava Gardner
 Judy Garland
 Betty Garrett
 Greer Garson
 Paulette Goddard
 Dolores Gray
 Kathryn Grayson
 Jean Harlow
 Katharine Hepburn
 Lena Horne
 Betty Hutton
 Louis Jourdan
 Buster Keaton
 Howard Keel
 Gene Kelly
 Grace Kelly
 Hedy Lamarr
 Angela Lansbury
 Peter Lawford
 Vivien Leigh
 Oscar Levant
 Carole Lombard
 Myrna Loy
 Jeanette MacDonald
 Tony Martin
 Joan McCracken
 Ann Miller
 Carmen Miranda
 Marilyn Monroe
 Ricardo Montalbán
 Polly Moran
 Jules Munshin
 George Murphy
 Donald O'Connor
 Janis Paige
 Eleanor Powell
 Jane Powell
 Elvis Presley
 Luise Rainer
 Debbie Reynolds
 Ginger Rogers
 Mickey Rooney
 Norma Shearer
 Frank Sinatra
 Ann Sothern
 Elizabeth Taylor 
 Robert Taylor
 Lana Turner
 Nancy Walker
 Esther Williams
 Robert Young
 Tom Cat (voiced by William Hanna) (special appearance)
 Jerry Mouse (voiced by Sara Berner) (special appearance)

Musical numbers 
 "Here's to the Girls" - Fred Astaire from Ziegfeld Follies (1946)
 "My Pet Song" - The Five Locust Sisters from The Five Locust Sisters (1928)
 "Singin' in the Rain" (finale) - Cliff Edwards and Chorus from The Hollywood Revue of 1929 (1929)
 "The Lockstep" - Dodge Twins from The March of Time (1930)
 "Clean as a Whistle" - MGM Studio Orchestra and Chorus from Meet the Baron (1933)
 "Ah, Sweet Mystery of Life" - Jeanette MacDonald and  Nelson Eddy from Naughty Marietta (1935)
 "Hollywood Party" - MGM Studio Orchestra and Chorus from Hollywood Party (1934)
 "Follow in my Footsteps" - Eleanor Powell, Robert Taylor and George Murphy from Broadway Melody of 1938 (1937)
 "Fascinating Rhythm" - Eleanor Powell from Lady Be Good (1941)
 "Good Morning" - Mickey Rooney and Judy Garland from Babes in Arms (1939)
 "Ten Percent Off" - Jimmy Durante and Esther Williams from This Time for Keeps (1947)
 "Tom and Jerry" - Esther Williams from Dangerous When Wet (1953)
 "Finale of Bathing Beauty" - Esther Williams from Bathing Beauty (1944)
 "Cleopatterer" - June Allyson from Till the Clouds Roll By (1946)
 "The Three B's" - June Allyson, Nancy Walker and Gloria DeHaven from Best Foot Forward (1943)
 "My Heart Sings" - Kathryn Grayson from Anchors Aweigh (1945)
 "Shakin' the Blues Away" - Ann Miller from Easter Parade (1948)
 "Pass That Peace Pipe" - Joan McCracken and Ray McDonald from Good News (1947)
 "On The Town" - Gene Kelly, Frank Sinatra, Ann Miller, Vera-Ellen, Betty Garrett and Jules Munshin from On the Town (1949)
 "Baby, You Knock Me Out" - Cyd Charisse from It's Always Fair Weather (1955)
 "Ballin' the Jack" - Judy Garland and Gene Kelly from For Me and My Gal (1942)
 "Newspaper Dance" - Gene Kelly from Summer Stock (1950)
 "Slaughter on Tenth Avenue" - Vera-Ellen and Gene Kelly from Words and Music (1948)
 "An American in Paris" - Gene Kelly and Leslie Caron from An American in Paris (1951)
 "Fit as a Fiddle" - Gene Kelly and Donald O'Connor from Singin' in the Rain (1952)
 "The Heather on the Hill" - Gene Kelly and Cyd Charisse from Brigadoon (1954)
 "You Are My Lucky Star" (outtake) - Debbie Reynolds from Singin' in the Rain (1952)
 "You Stepped Out of a Dream" - Tony Martin from Ziegfeld Girl (1941)
 "A Lady Loves" - Debbie Reynolds from I Love Melvin (1953)
 "Thanks a Lot But No Thanks" - Dolores Gray from It's Always Fair Weather (1955)
 "Two Faced Woman" - Joan Crawford (dubbed by India Adams) from Torch Song (1953)
 "Two Faced Woman" (outtake) - Cyd Charisse (dubbed by India Adams) from The Band Wagon (1953)
 "The Kissing Bandit" - Ricardo Montalbán, with Cyd Charisse and Ann Miller from The Kissing Bandit (1949)
 "Baião (Ca-Room' Pa Pa)" - Carmen Miranda and chorus, from Nancy Goes to Rio (1950) 
 "Mama Yo Quiero" - Mickey Rooney from Babes on Broadway (1941)
 "Where or When" - Lena Horne from Words and Music (1948)
 "Just One of Those Things" - Lena Horne from Panama Hattie (1942)
 "Ain't it the Truth" (outtake) - Lena Horne from Cabin in the Sky (1943)
 "Can't Help Lovin' Dat Man" - Ava Gardner from Show Boat (1951)
 "Can't Help Lovin' Dat Man" - Lena Horne from Till the Clouds Roll By (1946)
 "I'm an Indian Too" (outtake) - Judy Garland from Annie Get Your Gun (1950)
 "Doin' What Comes Natur'lly" (outtake) - Judy Garland from Annie Get Your Gun (1950)
 "I Wish I Were in Love Again" - Judy Garland and Mickey Rooney from Words and Music (1948)
 "Swing Mr Mendelssohn" - Judy Garland from Everybody Sing (1938)
 "In Between" - Judy Garland from Love Finds Andy Hardy (1938)
 "Follow the Yellow Brick Road" and "You're Off to See the Wizard" - Judy Garland and The Munchkins from The Wizard of Oz (1939)
 "Over the Rainbow" - Judy Garland from The Wizard of Oz (1939)
 "How About You?" - Judy Garland and Mickey Rooney from Babes on Broadway (1941)
 "Minnie from Trinidad" - Judy Garland from Ziegfeld Girl (1941)
 "Who (Stole My Heart Away)?" - Judy Garland from Till the Clouds Roll By (1946)
 "March of the Doagies" - Judy Garland, Ray Bolger, Cyd Charisse and Marjorie Main from The Harvey Girls (1946)
 "Get Happy" - Judy Garland from Summer Stock (1950)
 "Mr Monotony" - (outtake) Judy Garland from Easter Parade (1948)
 "It Only Happens When I Dance with You" - Fred Astaire and Ann Miller from Easter Parade (1948)
 "Jukebox Dance" - music only, from Broadway Melody of 1940 (1940)
 "Coffee Time" - Fred Astaire and Lucille Bremer from Yolanda and the Thief (1945)
 "Drum Crazy" - Fred Astaire from Easter Parade (1948)
 "The Girl Hunt Ballet" - Fred Astaire and Cyd Charisse from The Band Wagon (1953)
 "Swing Trot" (main title) - Fred Astaire and Ginger Rogers from The Barkleys of Broadway (1949)
 "I Wanna be a Dancin' Man" - Fred Astaire from The Belle of New York (1952)
 "Anything You Can Do" - Betty Hutton and Howard Keel from Annie Get Your Gun (1950)
 "Stereophonic Sound" - Fred Astaire and Janis Paige from Silk Stockings (1957)
 "Shakin' the Blues Away" - Doris Day from Love Me or Leave Me (1956)
 "Jailhouse Rock" - Elvis Presley from Jailhouse Rock (1957)
 "Gigi" - Louis Jourdan from Gigi (1958)
 "That's Entertainment!" - Fred Astaire and Cyd Charisse from The Band Wagon (1953)

 Year-end lists 
 Top 5 runners-up (not ranked) – Scott Schuldt, The Oklahoman Honorable mention – Mike Clark, USA Today''

References

External links 
 
 
 

1994 films
1994 documentary films
1990s musical films
American documentary films
American musical films
Documentary films about films
Metro-Goldwyn-Mayer films
Documentary films about Hollywood, Los Angeles
Compilation films
Films scored by Marc Shaiman
American sequel films
1990s English-language films
1990s American films